Thumbelina (also known as Hans Christian Andersen's Thumbelina) is a 1994 American independent animated musical fantasy film directed by Don Bluth and Gary Goldman, based on the story of the same name by Hans Christian Andersen. The film stars the voices of Jodi Benson, Gary Imhoff and John Hurt, with supporting roles from Gino Conforti, Charo, Gilbert Gottfried, Carol Channing and Joe Lynch.

The film was produced by Don Bluth Ireland Ltd., and distributed by Warner Bros. under its Family Entertainment imprint was released in theaters on March 30, 1994. The film was a box-office bomb, grossing only $17 million dollars against its $28 million dollar budget, and received mixed reviews from critics.

Plot 
A lonely widow longing for a child of her own is given a barley seed by a friendly witch. The planted seed grows into a flower, and a tiny girl emerges from inside, no bigger than the old woman's thumb. The old woman names the tiny girl Thumbelina and raises her as her own. Although Thumbelina loves her mother, she craves companionship from someone her own size. One night, the fairy prince Cornelius stumbles upon Thumbelina after hearing her singing. The two take a ride on Cornelius' bumblebee and fall in love. During this ride, Mrs. Toad and her son Grundel are enchanted by Thumbelina's singing. That night, Mrs. Toad kidnaps Thumbelina, desiring her to join their show troupe and marry Grundel. Thumbelina is rescued by Jacquimo, a swallow. Meanwhile, Cornelius learns of her kidnapping and returns to his kingdom, the Vale of the Fairies, to ask his parents to try holding back the winter as long as they can, but they can only hold it for a day.

Grundel learns that Thumbelina escaped and ventures out to find her. While trying to get home, Thumbelina is ambushed by Berkeley Beetle, who promises to show her the way home if she sings at his Beetle Ball. She reluctantly complies, but her bug disguise falls off during the concert, and she is denounced as "ugly" as well as being publicly humiliated in front of the audience. Beetle rejects her without helping her. She is next found by Jacquimo, who promises to find Cornelius. Beetle is confronted by Grundel and suggests that Grundel kidnap Cornelius and use him as bait to lure Thumbelina. Grundel coerces Beetle into partnership by removing his wings.

Upon the arrival of winter, Jacquimo injures his wing and loses consciousness from the freezing, while Cornelius falls into a pond by wind and is frozen. Beetle finds Cornelius' frozen body and takes him to Grundel. Thumbelina is forced to take refuge in an old shoe, where she is discovered by Miss Fieldmouse and granted shelter in her underground house. After relaying Cornelius' fate to her, Miss Fieldmouse introduces her to her neighbor Mr. Mole, who becomes infatuated with her and desires to marry her. Devastated by the apparent loss of Cornelius, Thumbelina gives in to hopelessness and accepts Mr. Mole's proposal. Jacquimo revives and, before Thumbelina can get a chance to explain to him what happened to Cornelius, resolves to find him before the wedding.

Beetle tells Grundel of Thumbelina's wedding. When they leave Cornelius behind, a trio of friendly insect children find and thaw Cornelius. At the wedding, Thumbelina finds herself unable to marry Mr. Mole after remembering Cornelius' promise to always love her. Grundel and Beetle arrive, and a chase ensues. Cornelius also arrives and engages Grundel in a fight, which culminates with the two falling into a chasm. Thumbelina escapes on a pile of Mr. Mole's treasure, causing it to fall at Mr. Mole and the wedding guests. Jacquimo finds the Vale of the Fairies and takes Thumbelina there. She and Cornelius reunite, and she magically grows her own pair of wings upon accepting his proposal and kissing him. With her mother and the fairy court in attendance, the two marry and depart on Cornelius' bumblebee.

The credits images reveal that Beetle's wings regrew, and he resumed his pop career; Grundel survived the fall with a broken leg and married a female toad to his mom's delight, and Mr. Mole married Miss Fieldmouse.

Voice cast 
 Jodi Benson as Thumbelina, a tiny young girl who is not as big as her adoptive mother's thumb and falls in love with the handsome fairy prince Cornelius.
 Gary Imhoff as Prince Cornelius, the Prince of the Fairies and Thumbelina's love interest.
 Joe Lynch as Grundel Toad, a lustful toad in love with Thumbelina
 Gino Conforti as Jacquimo, a wise swallow who speaks with a French accent. He is the partial narrator of the story.
 Gilbert Gottfried as Berkeley Beetle, a beetle singer who owns his own "beetle band" and a so-called "connoisseur of sweet nectars, a designer of rare threads, and a judge of beautiful women". He is forced by Grundel to help him to find Thumbelina.
 Carol Channing as Ms. Fieldmouse, a rather greedy yet kind field mouse who takes Thumbelina in from the cold and persuades her to marry Mr. Mole.
 John Hurt as Mr. Mole, a fabulously wealthy but self-involved and cynical mole who falls in love with Thumbelina after hearing her voice.
 Barbara Cook as Thumbelina's Mother, the kind widow who mothers Thumbelina since her birth from a flower.
 Charo as Mrs. Toad, a gorgeous and famous Spanish singer and mother to her three sons Mozo, Gringo, and Grundel.
 Kenneth Mars as King Colbert, Cornelius' father.
 June Foray as Queen Tabitha, Cornelius' mother.
 Will Ryan as Hero Dog, Reverend Rat. Additionally, Ryan voiced multiple background characters, including several beetles, barnyard animals, and other various insects.
 Danny Mann as Mozo, Grundel's younger brother.
 Loren Lester as Gringo, Grundel's younger brother.
 Pat Musick as Mrs. Rabbit
 Neil Ross as Mr. Bear, Mr. Fox
 Tawny Sunshine Glover as Gnatty, one of the jitterbugs.
 Michael Nunes as Li'l Bee, one of the jitterbugs.
 Kendall Cunningham as Baby Bug, one of the jitterbugs.
 Tony Jay (uncredited) as a bull on the farm of Thumbelina's mother.

Music 

Barry Manilow agreed to compose the songs for three Don Bluth pictures. Thumbelina was the first, followed by The Pebble and the Penguin, and the third, a retelling of the story of Rapunzel, in which Manilow would also have a voice role, was canceled. The film's soundtrack was released for a limited time and has since gone out of print. "Marry the Mole" won the first and sole Razzie for Worst Original Song.

Production and release 
Thumbelina was in production from February 1991 to May 1993 at Don Bluth Ireland Ltd. (formerly known as Sullivan Bluth Studios at that time) in Dublin, Ireland, even though principal recording and animation would not begin until early 1992. The film was completed with funds from filmmaker John Boorman and Hong Kong-based Media Assets after Don Bluth Entertainment filed for bankruptcy.

It was originally scheduled to be distributed by Metro-Goldwyn-Mayer in North America and J&M Entertainment overseas, and was also originally slated for a Thanksgiving 1993 release in the United States. However, by the time it was completed, both companies dropped the arrangement due to concerns about the bankruptcy of Bluth's studio. During Sullivan Bluth's bankruptcy proceedings, the court trustee presented the film to Disney's film distribution unit, Buena Vista Pictures Distribution. The trustee ultimately declined Disney's offer to distribute the film as they were also trying to find a new owner for the studio.

Warner Bros.  bought the distribution rights on March 15, 1993, and Thumbelina was released on March 30, 1994. When released, it was preceded by the Animaniacs short, I'm Mad.

Reception

Box office 
The film was a commercial failure, grossing $11.4 million at the US and Canadian box office. In 24 markets internationally it grossed $5.2 million for a worldwide total of at least $16.6 million against a budget of $28 million.

Critical reception 
Rotten Tomatoes gave the film a 38% approval rating based on 13 reviews, with an average score of 5.2 out of 10.

James Berardinelli of ReelViews gave the film 3 out of 4 and wrote: "Thumbelina is close to, but not quite at, the level of The Little Mermaid, the weakest of Disney's recent entries". Roger Ebert gave the film two stars out of four, concluding his review: "It is difficult to imagine anyone over the age of 12 finding much to enjoy in Thumbelina".

It won a Golden Raspberry Award in the category of "Worst Original Song" given to "Marry the Mole", sung by Carol Channing. It was also the only animated film to win a stand-alone Razzie until 2017's The Emoji Movie, which won the awards for Worst Picture, Worst Director, Worst Screen Combo, and Worst Screenplay at the 38th Golden Raspberry Awards.

The film reportedly received higher scores during test screenings, where Warner Bros. replaced their logo with that of Walt Disney Pictures.

Home media
Warner Home Video released Thumbelina on VHS and LaserDisc on July 26, 1994, in the United States and Canada and internationally throughout the 1990s. The film was re-released on VHS in the United Kingdom on March 20, 1995. Warner Home Video released the film on DVD on September 21, 1999.

Thumbelina was re-released on VHS and DVD by 20th Century Fox Home Entertainment on February 19, 2002 and on Blu-ray on March 6, 2012.

The film was available to view on Disney+ when it launched on November 12, 2019, following Disney's acquisition of 21st Century Fox earlier that year. However, it was removed on July 1, 2020. It remains available to view in other countries. The film returned to the service on October 22, 2021, but has since been removed again. The movie was also available to view on Disney+ via the international brand Star when Star was launched on October 27, 2021 in Japan.

See also 

 List of Warner Bros. theatrical animated features
 List of American films of 1994

References

Notes

External links 
 
 
 
 

1994 films
1994 animated films
1990s American animated films
1990s children's animated films
1990s fantasy adventure films
1990s musical films
American children's animated adventure films
American children's animated fantasy films
American children's animated musical films
American fantasy adventure films
American musical fantasy films
Animated teen films
1990s children's fantasy films
Films about witchcraft
Films about child abduction
Films about fairies and sprites
Films based on Thumbelina
Films directed by Don Bluth
Films directed by Gary Goldman
Films produced by Don Bluth and Gary Goldman
Films produced by John Pomeroy
Films scored by William Ross
Films set in the 15th century
Animated films set in France
Films with screenplays by Don Bluth
Golden Raspberry Award winning films
Rotoscoped films
Sullivan Bluth Studios films
Warner Bros. films
Warner Bros. animated films
1990s English-language films
American independent films